Joseph was the Patriarch of Antioch, and head of the Syriac Orthodox Church from 790 until he died in 792.

Biography 
Prior to his consecration as patriarch, Joseph was a monk at the Monastery of Gubba Baraya, near Mabbogh. According to Dionysius I Telmaharoyo, Joseph was elected as patriarch in 790 in fear of the Monastery of Gubba Baraya, which was powerful enough to cause serious disruption to the church. He is not considered to have been particularly intelligent as a result of his lack of education.

Soon after his consecration, Zachariah, former Bishop of Edessa, who had been removed due to complaints from local clergy, convinced Joseph to travel with him to the city to persuade locals to accept him as their bishop. The Syriac Orthodox population of Edessa, however, rejected Zachariah. Joseph served as patriarch until he died in 792 whilst visiting a monastery near Tell Beshmay.

References

Bibliography 
 

8th-century Syriac Orthodox Church bishops
Syriac Patriarchs of Antioch from 512 to 1783
8th-century Oriental Orthodox archbishops
8th-century births
792 deaths
Syrian archbishops
Upper Mesopotamia under the Abbasid Caliphate
8th-century people from the Abbasid Caliphate